Bromborough railway station is one of two stations serving the town of Bromborough in Merseyside, England. The station is situated on the Chester and Ellesmere Port branches of the Wirral Line, part of the Merseyrail network.

History 

The station is on the former Chester and Birkenhead Railway, which opened in 1840.  The station itself opened in 1841.

Direct train services to Liverpool began in 1985, when the line between Rock Ferry and Hooton was electrified; previously passengers for Liverpool had to change at Rock Ferry.  Further electrification by British Rail in early 1990s allowed electric train services to be extended, first to Chester in 1993 and then Ellesmere Port in 1994.

Facilities
The station is staffed, during all opening hours, and has platform CCTV. There is a payphone, a vending machine and a booking office. There are departure and arrival screens, on the platform, for passenger information. Each of the two platforms has sheltered seating. There is a free car park with 87 spaces, which is across Allport Road, a cycle rack with 8 spaces, and a secure cycle locker with 76 spaces. Access to the station booking office from Allport Road is straightforward. Access to each of the two platforms is by a stepped ramp or a staircase. This allows relatively easy access for passengers with wheelchairs or prams. Platform access has not been modernised to the standard of that at Hooton.

From 17 July 2020 to January 2021 the station car park will close for upgrades, including the creation of 50 new car parking spaces by extending the car park to the south. There will also be work to upgrade the electricity supply for new Merseyrail trains.

Services 
Trains operate every 15 minutes between Chester and Liverpool on weekdays and Saturdays until late evening when the service becomes half-hourly, as it is on Sundays. Additionally there is a half-hourly service between Liverpool and Ellesmere Port all day, every day. Northbound trains operate via Hamilton Square station in Birkenhead and the Mersey Railway Tunnel to Liverpool. Southbound trains all proceed as far as Hooton, where the lines to Chester and Ellesmere Port divide. These services are all provided by Merseyrail's fleet of Class 507 and Class 508 EMUs.

Gallery

References

Further reading

External links 

Railway stations in the Metropolitan Borough of Wirral
DfT Category E stations
Former Birkenhead Railway stations
Railway stations in Great Britain opened in 1841
Railway stations served by Merseyrail